Sangamo Therapeutics, Inc. (previously known as Sangamo Biosciences, Inc.) is an American biotechnology company based in Brisbane, California.  It applies cell and gene therapy to combat haemophilia and other genetic diseases.

History
The company was founded in 1995 in Richmond, California. It was originally known as Sangamo Biosciences, Inc. before changing names in 2017. In September 2018, it had 182 employees. Sandy Macrae is the president. In 2018, Edward Rebar became the senior vice president and chief technology officer of Sangamo.

Research
Sangamo applies technology to treat haemophilia B and lysosomal storage diseases including mucopolysaccharidosis type I (Hurler Syndrome) and mucopolysaccharidosis type II (Hunter Syndrome). The FDA granted Sangamo fast track designation for SB-525, a gene therapy candidate for haemophilia A. In its partnership with Pfizer in 2017, Sangamo uses Bioverativ in hemoglobinopathies such as beta thalassemia and sickle cell disease. It is also developing zinc finger gene editing technology.

In February 2019, medical scientists, working with Sangamo Therapeutics, announced the first ever "in body" human gene editing therapy to permanently alter DNA - in a patient with Hunter syndrome.   clinical trials by Sangamo involving gene editing using zinc finger nuclease were ongoing.

Clinical trials
Sangamo's programs are a mix of wholly owned and partnered; major partners include Pfizer, Biogen, Sanofi, Takeda, and Kite (a Gilead company).

As of 2020 Sangamo had the following clinical trials underway in the US:

 Phase 1/2 Thales study in beta thalassemia
 Phase 1/2 STAAR study in Fabry disease
 Phase 1/2 PRECIZN-1 study in sickle cell disease
 Phase 1/2 CHAMPIONS study in MPS II
 Phase 1/2 EMPOWERS study in MPS I
 Phase 1/2 Alta study in hemophilia A
 Phase 1 FIXTENDZ study in hemophilia B
In February 2023, Sangamo Therapeutics announced that it would stop the late-stage development for the Phase 1/2 PRECIZN-1 study of BIVV003 its sickle cell drug.

See also
 Alan Wolffe

References

External links
 

Companies based in San Mateo County, California
Biotechnology companies of the United States
1995 establishments in California
Orphan drug companies
Biotechnology companies established in 1995
Health care companies based in California